The Order of Queen Saint Isabel is a Roman Catholic dynastic order of which the Grand Mistress is the Duchess of Braganza.

History 
King John VI of Portugal created the order on 4 November 1801 in honour of Queen Saint Isabel, consort of Portuguese King Denis I, investing his wife Carlota Joaquina as Grand Mistress of the order.  

On 5 October 1910, the monarchy was replaced by a republic. The order, which was considered dynastic, continued to be bestowed by King Manuel II of Portugal, who in exile also awarded it to his wife. After his death, the Queen and Queen Mother both continued to use the order's insignia of Grand Mistress. 

In 1986, Duarte Pio, Duke of Braganza re-established the Order of Saint Isabel as an honorific dynastic order of the Portuguese Royal Family, and claimed its Sovereign Grand Mastership. The Duchess of Braganza is the current Grand Mistress and, besides honouring Portuguese noblewomen on the Saint's feast day, celebrated each year on 4 July at the Monastery of Santa Clara-a-Nova in Coimbra, the Royal House has, since 2000, bestowed it on various queens, princesses and women dedicated to the support of Portuguese charities.

Insignia 
The order's sash is pale pink and has a white stripe in the middle. On the accompanying crowned medallion is a picture of the Queen Saint giving money to a poor man. This picture is surrounded by a frame with roses (an allusion to the Queen's miracle). The insignia's motto is Pauperum Solatio ("Consolation of the Poor").

Current Dames of Saint-Isabel 
The annual ceremonial induction of Noble ladies of Saint Isabel takes place in the Convent of Santa Clara in Coimbra, on the 4th of July.
Dame Grand Mistress
 The Duchess of Braganza
Dames
 The Duchess of Coimbra 
 The Grand Duchess of Luxemburg
 The Duchess of Castro
 The Custodian of the Crown of Romania
 Princess Margaretha of Luxembourg
 Princess Christine of Orléans-Braganza
 Princess Eleonora, Princess of Ligne
 Princess Marie-Therese of Hohenberg

See also 
 Order of Saint Michael of the Wing
 Order of the Immaculate Conception of Vila Viçosa

References

Bibliography & Image 

 Secretariado de Estado da Cultura. Tesouros Reais. Lisbon: Textype - Artes Gráficas, Ld.ª, 1992. 
 Evaristo, Carlos. Gli Ordini Portoghesi Della Casa Di Braganza: Evoluzione Storica Ed Attualita pp 227–240

External links
rainhasantaisabel.org Official Site of the Royal Order of Saint Isabel

 
Isabel
Saint Isabel, Order of
Saint Isabel, Order of
Awards established in 1801